The Dominican Republic women's national field hockey team represents the Dominican Republic in women's international field hockey competitions. The team won the silver medal at the 2014 Central American and Caribbean Games in Veracruz, Mexico.

Tournament record

Pan American Games
 2003 – 8th place
 2015 – 7th place

Central American and Caribbean Games
 2006 – 8th place
 2010 – 4th place
 2014 – 
 2018 – 5th place
 2023 – Qualified

Hockey World League
 2014–15 – 33rd place

Bolivarian Games
2013 –

See also
Dominican Republic men's national field hockey team

References

External links
 National Hockey Federation Website

Americas women's national field hockey teams
Field Hockey
National team